Tricimba lineella is a species of frit fly in the family Chloropidae. It is found in Europe.

References

Oscinellinae
Articles created by Qbugbot
Insects described in 1820